Zero Church is a 2002 album by sisters Suzzy and Maggie Roche, formerly of the Roches. It was originally scheduled for release on September 11, 2001, but this was delayed until about 4 months later. It consists of songs made out of prayers the Roche sisters heard while taking part in a Harvard University arts collaborative.

Track listing
Couldn't Hear Nobody Pray
Jeremiah
Anyway
Each of Us Has a Name
Why Am I Praying
Teach Me O Lord
Hallelujah
A Prayer
Praise Song for a New Day
Sounds 
Allende
This Gospel How Precious
New York City
Aveenu Malcainu
Together With You
God Bless the Artists
Musical Prayer
Musical Prayer

References

2002 albums
The Roches albums
Red House Records albums